Mineral Springs is an unincorporated community in Clearfield County, Pennsylvania, United States. Mineral Springs has a post office, with ZIP code 16855.

References

Unincorporated communities in Clearfield County, Pennsylvania
Unincorporated communities in Pennsylvania